Arbinda attacks refers to the following events in Burkina Faso:

 Arbinda attack, 24 December 2019
 Arbinda massacre, 18 August 2021